{{DISPLAYTITLE:C21H19ClN4O2}}
The molecular formula C21H19ClN4O2 (molar mass: 394.86 g/mol) may refer to:

 SB-242084
 Setanaxib
 SSR-180,575

Molecular formulas